G-protein coupled receptor 120 is a protein that in humans is encoded by the GPR120 gene.

GPR120 is a member of the rhodopsin family of G protein-coupled receptors (GPRs).

GPR120 has also been shown to mediate the anti-inflammatory and insulin-sensitizing effects of omega 3 fatty acids. Lack of GPR120 is responsible for reduced fat metabolism, thereby leading to obesity.

Additionally, GPR120 has been implicated to be involved in the ability to taste fats. It is expressed in taste bud cells (specifically cell type II, which contain other G-protein coupled taste receptors), and its absence leads to reduced preference to two types of fatty acid (linoleic acid and oleic acid), as well as decreased neuronal response to oral fatty acids.

References

Further reading

G protein-coupled receptors